During the 2007–08 English football season, Ipswich Town competed in the Football League Championship.

Season summary
Despite making a strong challenge for promotion during the season, Ipswich Town were denied the chance to participate in the play-offs for promotion to the Premier League on the last day of the season, with Crystal Palace and Watford taking the play-off places instead.

First-team squad

Left club during season

Reserve squad

Left club during season

Coaching staff

Pre-season

Legend

Competitions

Football League Championship

League table

Legend

Ipswich Town's score comes first

Matches

FA Cup

League Cup

Transfers

Transfers in

Loans in

Transfers out

Loans out

Squad statistics
All statistics updated as of end of season

Appearances and goals

|-
! colspan=14 style=background:#dcdcdc; text-align:center| Goalkeepers

|-
! colspan=14 style=background:#dcdcdc; text-align:center| Defenders

|-
! colspan=14 style=background:#dcdcdc; text-align:center| Midfielders

|-
! colspan=14 style=background:#dcdcdc; text-align:center| Forwards

|-
! colspan=14 style=background:#dcdcdc; text-align:center| Players transferred out during the season

|-

Goalscorers

Clean sheets

Disciplinary record

Starting 11
Considering starts in all competitions

Awards

Player awards

References

Ipswich Town F.C. seasons
Ipswich Town